The Martabe mine is one of the largest gold mines in Indonesia and in the world.

Background
The mine is located in the west of the country in North Sumatra. The mine has measured reserves (as of 31 December 2013) of 3.0 million oz of gold and 31.9 million oz of silver; these reserves are included in mineral resources (that may or may not be economic to mine) of 8.1 million oz of gold and 73.8 million oz of silver.

Engineering, procurement, and construction management (EPCM) services for Martabe Mine were provided by Ausenco Limited in 2011.

Martabe mine is owned and operated by a subsidiary of PT United Tractors Tbk, the largest distributor of heavy equipment in Indonesia.

References 

Gold mines in Indonesia